Stadion Stanovi (English: Stanovi Stadium)  is a football stadium in the Zadar, Croatia. It serves as the home ground for football club HNK Zadar. The stadium has a capacity of 3,858.

In the current form, the stadium was completed for the 1979 Mediterranean Games held in Split. Because of new license conditions of the Croatian Football Federation, the stadium was on 2008 equipped with a floodlight system. Further expansion of the stadium is planned. After his completion the new 5,500 seats are available.
The condition of the stadium does not meet the criteria of the HNS, especially UEFA. The most controversial is the wall at the end of the field, but this shortcoming has been removed. The problem was not solved until April 3, 2008, Hrvoje Ćustić, a player from Zadar who hit the wall with his head, was killed.

References

NK Zadar
Stanovi
Sport in Zadar
Buildings and structures completed in 1979
Buildings and structures in Zadar